"Vicious" is a song by Canadian singer Tate McRae, featuring vocals from American rapper Lil Mosey. It was released on June 19, 2020 through RCA Records. The song was written by the two artists, alongside producer Mark Nilan, and James Abrahart and Victoria Zaro.

Background
In a press statement, McRae said, "Super stoked to be dropping 'vicious' featuring Lil Mosey. I've always been a fan of his work, so it's super dope to have a rapper like him jump on this record. Soooo excited for everyone to hear what we've been working on!!"

She also filmed the music video herself at home during isolation, which is intertwined with animations that see her transform into her alter ego and enter another universe.

Personnel
Credits adapted from Tidal.
 Mark Nilan – producer, composer, lyricist, recording engineer
 James Abrahart – composer, lyricist
 Lathan Echols – composer, lyricist, associated performer, featured artist
 Tate McRae – composer, lyricist, associated performer
 Victoria Zaro – composer, lyricist
 Jeremie Inhaber – assistant engineer
 Scott Desmarais – assistant engineer
 Chris Galland – engineer
 Dave Kutch – mastering engineer
 Manny Marroquin – mixing engineer
 Benjamin Rice – vocal producer

Charts

Release history

References

2020 songs
2020 singles
Lil Mosey songs
Songs written by James Abrahart
Songs written by Tate McRae
Tate McRae songs